Hopper is an unincorporated community in Stronghurst Township, Henderson County, Illinois, United States.

History
Hopper was originally named Warren, Illinois. The village was laid out by Lambert Hopper on March 25, 1840. It was often called Hopper's Mill in the 19th century because Lambert Hopper and his son, Wesley Hopper, operated a thriving lumber mill in the area.

References

Further reading
History of Mercer and Henderson Counties

Unincorporated communities in Henderson County, Illinois
Unincorporated communities in Illinois
1840 establishments in Illinois
Populated places established in 1840